Bastedo is a surname. Notable people with the surname include:

 Alexandra Bastedo (1946–2014), British actress
 Frank Lindsay Bastedo (1886–1973), Lieutenant Governor of Saskatchewan
 Larry Bastedo (fl. 1950s–2010s), Canadian motorcycle racer

References